Świętej Anny Street (Polish: Ulica Świętej Anny, lit. St. Anne's Street) - a historic street in Kraków, Poland.

To the west, the street heads to a former Jewish quarter, hence its former name, Żydowska Street (Ulica Żydowska, lit. Jewish Street). Historically, the street saw the location of a synagogue, cemetery and a Jewish bath house until the fifteenth-century, when the Jewish population was moved to the north to the present location of Szczepański Square. The etymology of the street derives from the presence of the Church of St. Anne. The street features several university-related buildings, formerly housing colleges, dormitories and a library.

Features

References

Anny
Odonyms referring to religion